St James' Hospital is a mental health facility at Milton, Portsmouth, Hampshire, England. It is managed by Solent NHS Trust. The main structure is a Grade II listed building.

History
The hospital, which was designed by George Rake in the Gothic Revival style using a dual pavilion layout, opened as the Portsmouth Borough Asylum in September 1879. A sanatorium for the treatment of infectious diseases was completed in 1879 and the wards were extended in 1895. Four detached villas, designed by Albert Cogswell, were added in 1908. It became the Borough of Portsmouth Mental Hospital in 1914 and was requisitioned for military use during the First World War. After service as an Emergency Medical Service facility during the Second World War, it joined the National Health Service as St James' Hospital in 1948.

After the introduction of Care in the Community in the early 1980s, the hospital went into a period of decline and inpatient services significantly reduced. The land to the south of the hospital was registered as Portsmouth's first town green in 2001. By summer 2018, Solent NHS Trust only retained a small area of the site for mental health services. The site as a whole was marketed for redevelopment and sold to a property developer in January 2019.

References

Hospitals in Hampshire
NHS hospitals in England
Psychiatric hospitals in England
Hospital buildings completed in 1879
Hospitals established in 1879
1879 establishments in England